Ocoee Dam Number 2 is a hydroelectric dam on the Ocoee River in Polk County in the U.S. state of Tennessee.  The dam impounds the Ocoee No. 2 Reservoir and is one of three dams on the Toccoa/Ocoee River owned and operated by the Tennessee Valley Authority. It was completed in 1913.

It is situated at the center of one of the nation's top whitewater rafting locations, and the dam's releases help to maintain consistent rapids on the river during warmer months.

Location

The dam and reservoir are surrounded by the Cherokee National Forest, and the only major road access is provided via the Ocoee Scenic Byway, a section of U.S. Route 64.

Capacity

The two units at the powerhouse downstream from the dam have a generating capacity of 23,100 kilowatts. The dam typically schedules major recreational releases on weekends in spring and fall and five days per week in summer months.

The dam's flume consists of a wooden trough situated upon a shelf carved out of the cliffside.  The trough carries the water to a point just above the powerhouse where it drops the water  through two large steel pipes to the powerhouse below.  Without this flume system, the dam (at just 30 feet high) would be practically useless as a power plant.

There is also a funicular railway at the powerhouse site that is used for transport from the powerhouse to the flume.

History
Several private entities attempted to meet this demand by building dams that could produce hydroelectricity. In 1910, a group of financiers formed the Eastern Tennessee Power Company to use the Ocoee's hydro-power potential. ETPC completed Ocoee Dam No. 1 in late 1911, and work began on Ocoee Dam No. 2 the following year.

ETPC engineers realized that if the dam were built at the ideal powerhouse site, it would be unable to utilize the potential energy from the five-mile stretch immediately upstream in which the river drops  in elevation. Engineers solved this dilemma by constructing the  flume on the cliffs above the river gorge, which allows just a  drop in the water level from the point at which it exits the reservoir to the point at which it spills through the pipes into the powerhouse below. The dam was completed in 1913, and its two generators went online in October of that year.

TVA

In 1922, Eastern Tennessee Power merged with several other entities to form the Tennessee Electric Power Company (TEPCO).  TEPCO maintained Ocoee Dam No. 2 until 1939, when a U.S. Supreme Court decision forced the company to sell its assets to the Tennessee Valley Authority, which had been established to oversee flood control and development in the greater Tennessee River valley.  The $78 million (equivalent to $ in ) TVA paid for TEPCO included $2.59 million (equivalent to $ in ) for Ocoee Dam No. 2.

TVA made several improvements to the dam in the 1940s which increased the dam's generating capacity by 15%.  The dam's basic diversion design was used by TVA in the construction of Ocoee Dam No. 3 several miles upstream in 1942.  By 1976, Ocoee No. 2's flume had deteriorated, and TVA decided to shut it down.  To prevent it from being dismantled, several preservationist groups had the dam and flume placed on the National Register of Historic Places in 1979.  TVA renovated the flume with treated wood, and placed it back in operation in 1983.

References

External links

Ocoee No. 2 Reservoir — official TVA site
Ocoee No. 2 Recreational Release Schedule

Dams on the Hiwassee River
Buildings and structures in Polk County, Tennessee
Tennessee Valley Authority dams
Dams on the National Register of Historic Places in Tennessee
Hydroelectric power plants in Tennessee
Dams in Tennessee
Dams completed in 1913
Energy infrastructure completed in 1913
1913 establishments in Tennessee
National Register of Historic Places in Polk County, Tennessee